Annevig Schelde Ebbe (born August 6, 1983) is a Danish actress and voice actress from Aarhus, Denmark.

She contributes to acting Danish language dubbing. She dubs characters from cartoons, movies, anime, and more. She also played Mary Jensen in the DR 1 miniseries The Kingdom. She dubs Stacy Hirano, Vanessa Doofensmirtz, and other characters from Phineas and Ferb. She is the current Danish dubber of May, and Dawn from Pokémon.

Filmography

Dubbing 
 Mindy in Animaniacs
 Bloom in Winx Club
 Mac in Foster's Home for Imaginary Friends
 Clover in Totally Spies
 Taylor Mckessie in High School Musical
 Runo and other characters in Bakugan Battle Brawlers
 Hikari Uchiha in Naruto
 Brandy in Brandy & Mr. Whiskers
 Rainbow Dash in My Little Pony: Friendship is Magic and My Little Pony: Equestria Girls
 Stacy Hirano,Vanessa Doofensmirtz and other characters in Phineas and Ferb
 Patzy in Camp Lazlo
 Dawn, May, and other characters in Pokémon
 Sabrina Spellman in Sabrina: The Animated Series
 Sarah in Ed, Edd n Eddy
 Kitty in Kitty Is Not a Cat

Acting 
 Mary Jensen in The Kingdom
 and others

See also 
 The Kingdom
 SDI Media Denmark

References

External links
 
 

1983 births
Danish voice actresses
Living people
People from Aarhus